Sidney Nelson (1 January 1800 – 7 April 1862) was an English composer, particularly of songs, including the popular "Rose of Allendale" and "Mary of Argyle".

Life
Nelson was born in London in 1800, son of Solomon Nelson. Showing musical ability when quite young, he was adopted by a gentleman who gave him a good musical and general education. He was for some time a pupil of Sir George Smart, and eventually became a teacher in London. He was in partnership with Charles Jefferys as a music-seller until 1843, when he was elected an associate of the Philharmonic Society. Subsequently he became a music publisher, but, being unsuccessful, he arranged a musical and dramatic entertainment with members of his family, and went on tour in North America, Canada, and Australia.

He died in Russell Square, London on 7 April 1862, and was buried at West Ham; he left a widow, Sarah, and son Alfred Nelson.

Compositions
Nelson was a prolific composer, and claimed to have written about eight hundred pieces, some of which were published under an assumed name. He composed a burletta, The Grenadier, produced by Madame Vestris at the Olympic Theatre; The Cadi's Daughter, performed after Macbeth for William Macready's farewell benefit; and The Village Nightingale, words by Henry Thornton Craven, his son-in-law. He had a grand opera, Ulrica, in rehearsal at the Princess's Theatre, London under John Medex Maddox's management, but, owing to some dispute, it was not produced.

He was the author of Instructions in the Art of Singing and composed many duets, trios, piano pieces, and songs; some of the latter, such as "The Pilot" and "Rose of Allendale", attained considerable popularity. "Mary of Argyle" also became popular.

References

Attribution

External links
 

1800 births
1862 deaths
19th-century British composers